Ishaku Konda (born September 11, 1999) is a Ghanaian professional footballer who plays as a defender.

Club career

Wa All Stars 
Konda started his career with the Wa All Stars. He played 14 Premier League games for the club in the 2016 season which helped the club win the league and were crowned Ghana Premier league Champions.

Juniors OÖ 
In January 2019, he moved to the Austrian Bundesliga club LASK and signed a one-year contract until December 2019. He was however immediately sent out to their farm team second-tier side FC Juniors OÖ play. After the end of his contract, he left LASK.

He then returned to Ghana and moved to Kumasi-based Division 1 side Asokwa Deportivo FC.

Paide 
On 10 March 2021, Paide Linnameeskond announced via their club's website that they had signed Konda and they he would start training with the first team on 11 March 2021, after the end of his mandatory isolation period due to the COVID-19 pandemic. The signing made him the 3rd Ghanaian to join the Estonian giants after Abdul Razak Yussif and Deabeas Owusu-Sekyere.

International career 
Konda has capped for Ghana at the U-20 level for the Ghana national under-20 football team. He served as captain of the side in 2019. During both the qualification of the 2019 Africa U-20 Cup of Nations qualifiers and the 2019 Africa U-20 Cup of Nations.

Honours 
Wa All Stars

 Ghana Premier League: 2016
Ghana Super Cup: 2017

References

External links 
 
 
 

1999 births
Living people
Ghanaian footballers
FC Juniors OÖ players
Legon Cities FC players
Association football defenders
Ghana under-20 international footballers
Ghana Premier League players
Ghanaian expatriate sportspeople in Austria
Ghanaian expatriate sportspeople in Estonia
Paide Linnameeskond players